Margareta Kjellin (3 September 1948 – 15 February 2017) was a Swedish politician of the Moderate Party. She was a member of the Riksdag from 2006 until her death on 15 February 2017.

References

External links 
Margareta Kjellin

1948 births
2017 deaths
Members of the Riksdag from the Moderate Party
Women members of the Riksdag
Deaths from lung cancer
21st-century Swedish women politicians